Per mille (from Latin , "in each thousand")  is an expression that means parts per thousand. Other recognised spellings include per mil, per mill, permil, permill, or permille.

The associated sign is written , which looks like a percent sign  with an extra zero or o in the divisor.

The term occurs so rarely in English that major dictionaries do not agree on the spelling and some major dictionaries such as Macmillan do not even contain an entry. The term is more common in other European languages where it is used to express fractions smaller than 1%. One common usage is blood alcohol content, which is usually expressed as a percentage in English-speaking countries.

Per mille should not be confused with parts per million (ppm).

Computer systems
The code point for the glyph is included in the General Punctuation block of Unicode characters: .

Note that for the compose key sequence the percent key (%) is followed by lower case letter o and not, as might be expected, by digit 0.

Examples

Examples of use include:
 Legal limits of blood-alcohol content for driving a road vehicle in some countries: for example: 0.5‰ or 0.8‰.
 Seawater salinity: for example: "the average salinity is 35‰".
 Tunnel and railway gradients (in some countries in Europe).
 Birth and death rates.
 Baseball batting averages (colloquially).
 Property taxation rates: the millage rate (U.S.) or mill rate (Canada).
 Expressing stable-isotope ratios—for example: "δ13C was measured at −3.5‰".
 Fineness of precious metals.
 Cost per mille (CPM), the price of 1000 units, may be used for views of banner and display advertising, and for emails delivered by email service providers.

Related units 
 Percentage point difference of 1 part in 100
 Percentage (%) 1 part in 100
 Basis point (bp) difference of 1 part in 10,000
 Permyriad (‱) 1 part in 10,000
 Per cent mille (pcm) 1 part in 100,000

See also 
 Parts-per notation
 Per-unit system
 Percent point function
 Fineness of precious metals (given as "0.000-fine")

References

External links

1000 (number)
Typographical symbols